Municipal elections were held in Israel on 11 November 2008.

Results

See also
2008 Haifa mayoral election
2008 Jerusalem mayoral election
2008 Tel Aviv mayoral election

References

municipal
Municipal elections in Israel
Israel